The Kuroiwa's ground gecko (Goniurosaurus kuroiwae) (from Japanese: クロイワトカゲモドキ/黒岩蜥蜴擬), also known as the Ryukyu eyelid gecko, Kuroiwa's leopard gecko, Kuroiwa's eyelid gecko, Okinawan ground gecko, or Tokashiki gecko, is a species of lizards in the family Eublepharidae. The species is endemic to the Okinawa Islands in the Ryukyu Archipelago, Japan.

Etymology
The specific name, kuroiwae, is in honor of T. Kuroiwa, collector of the holotype.

Habitat
Kuroiwa's ground gecko occurs in subtropical forests in karst limestone areas at elevations below . It forages on small invertebrates in leaf litter at night.

References

Further reading
Namiye M (1912). "[The geckos from the Okinawa Islands]". Dobutugaku Zasshi [Zoological Magazine], Tokyo 24: 442–445. (Gymnodactylus albofasciatus kuroiwae, new subspecies). (in Japanese).

Goniurosaurus
Endemic reptiles of Japan
Endemic fauna of the Ryukyu Islands
Reptiles described in 1912
Taxonomy articles created by Polbot